Giullian Yao Gioiello (born September 24, 1992) is an American actor, musician and songwriter. He is known for his portrayal of Gus in the Netflix series Julie's Greenroom, BB on Marvel's Iron Fist, and Manny in VH1's Scream: Resurrection. He also officially released his first single Goodnight Baby on January 16, 2019 on streaming platforms under the name Tarune through an Instagram post.

Personal life and family
Gioiello was born and raised in Manhattan, New York. He has a fraternal twin sister, Lucia Gioiello. He was raised by his father, Rick Gioiello who is from The Bronx. His mother, Shu-Fen Yao, is of Taiwanese descent, and is the founder of Century Contemporary Dance Company. He attended Fiorello H. LaGuardia High School in New York City, and graduated the Tisch School of the Arts BFA Acting program at New York University in 2014.

Career
On September 13, 2017, it was announced that Gioiello was cast in Scream: Resurrection, the third season of the VH1 slasher television series Scream. He would star in the role of Manny. The season premiered on July 8, 2019.

Filmography

Film

Television

References

External links

Male actors from New York City
American male film actors
American male television actors
1992 births
Living people
American twins
American male actors of Taiwanese descent
American people of Italian descent